Philip A. Rea is a British biochemist, science writer and educator, who is currently Professor of Biology and Rebecka and Arie Belldegrun Distinguished Director of the Vagelos Program in Life Sciences & Management at the University of Pennsylvania.  His major contributions as a biochemist have been in the areas of membrane transport and xenobiotic detoxification, and as a science writer and educator in understanding the intersection between the life sciences and their implementation.  In 2005, he and Mark V. Pauly founded the Roy and Diana Vagelos Program in Life Sciences & Management between the School of Arts and Sciences and Wharton School at the University of Pennsylvania, which he continues to co-direct in his capacity as Belldegrun Distinguished Director.  Rea's work on serendipity in science has been featured in The Wall Street Journal. Additionally, he has served as a subject matter expert for 'The Scientist.

 Education 
Rea was educated in the comprehensive school system at Gartree High School, and Beachamp Upper School, Oadby, Leicester, before receiving his BSc in Biological Sciences with First Class Honors from the University of Sussex in 1978, and his DPhil in Plant Biochemistry from the Department of Plant Sciences and Magdalen College, University of Oxford in 1982. After his doctorate, he served as an MRC Research Fellow at the John Radcliffe Hospital, University of Oxford from 1982-1984 before joining the Department of Biology at McGill University in 1984 as a Merit Research Associate.  From 1985 to 1987, he was an AFRC Research Fellow in the Department of Biology at the University of York, UK. Immediately before his appointment by the University of Pennsylvania in 1990, he was a Group Leader in the Department of Biochemistry, Rothamsted Research (formerly Institute of Arable Crops Research), UK.

 Research 
Rea is known for his work on vacuolar proton (H+) pumps, ATP-binding cassette (ABC) transporters, and the enzyme phytochelatin (PC) synthase. His early work on plant vacuolar H+-pumping ATPases resulted in the first definitive determination of the subunit composition of one of these enzymes and contributed to the concept of a new category of ATPases, so-called ‘V-type ATPases’ (Manolson et al 1985).  These studies, in turn, opened the way for biochemical and molecular investigations of these enzymes from many different sources, leading to recognition that the plant enzyme is just one example of a category of primary H+ pumps common to both plant and animal cells.  Other contributions made by Rea in this specific area included elucidation of the gross topography of the V-ATPase, demonstrating that its organization is analogous to that of the F-type ATPases of ‘energy coupling’ membranes (Rea et al 1987a; Rea et al 1987b), and purification of the enzyme in its entirety to establish that the holoenzyme is a 12-15 subunit, complex comprising a peripheral, nucleotide-binding V1 sector and an intrinsic, H+-conductive V0 sector (Parry et al 1989).  Collectively, these discoveries provided some of the earliest evidence that V-type and F-type H+-ATPases are paralogous.

When Rea entered the field of vacuolar energetics, there were indications that plant vacuolar membranes also contained H+-pumping inorganic pyrophosphatases, which he confirmed by demonstrating that the membrane-associated vacuolar inorganic pyrophosphatase (V-PPase) of plants catalyzes pyrophosphate- (PPi-) energized electrogenic H+- translocation (Rea and Poole 1985) and is both functionally and chromatographically separable from the ATP-energized V-ATPase found on the same membrane (Rea and Poole 1986; Rea and Sanders 1987).  What then followed was a broad range of discoveries made by Rea’s group concerned with defining the basic organization and core catalytic capabilities of the V-PPase.  These included: (1) Purification of the pump, in parallel with identification of the major subunit through its substrate-protectable covalent modification with radiolabeled ligands (Britten et al 1989); (2) Molecular cloning of the pump (AVP1) from Arabidopsis thaliana (Sarafian et al 1992), the very first V-PPase to be cloned from any source; (3) In vitro reconstitution of the transport activity of the purified pump (Britten et al 1992); (4) Definition of the pump as a new category of ion translocase, together with speculations (which were subsequently confirmed) that the D[X]7KXE motif common to both vacuolar and soluble PPases participates directly in catalysis (Rea et al 1992); (5) Heterologous expression of the pump from Arabidopsis in yeast (Saccharomyces cerevisiae), to demonstrate that the ‘substrate-binding subunit’ alone is sufficient for PPi-dependent H+-translocation (Kim et al 1994); (6) Identification of aminomethylenediphosphonate (AMDP) as a potent type-specific inhibitor of the pump from both plant and photosynthetic bacterial sources (Baykov et al 1993; Zhen et al 1994); (7) Protein chemical identification of the maleimide-reactive domain of the pump and modeling of the topology of the C-terminal half of the molecule by peptide mapping and the deployment of both membrane-permeant and membrane-impermeant maleimides (Zhen et al 1994); (8) Identification of acidic residues required for coupling PPi hydrolysis to H+-translocation by the pump (Zhen et al 1997); (9) Isolation and functional characterization of a thermostable sequence-divergent homolog from the extremophilic archaeon Pyrobaculum aerophilum (Drozdowicz et al 1999); (10) Molecular identification, isolation and functional characterization of a type II (K+-independent) version of the pump from Arabidopsis and the first demonstration that members of this pump category fall into two distinct classes (Drozdowicz et al 2000); (11) Comparative genomic analyses of V-PPases to disclose examples of this pump category in all three domains of life and confirm the notion of two paralogous series, typified by the type I and type II enzymes (Drozdowicz et al 2001); (12) Molecular isolation, functional characterization and cellular localization of a type I pump from the parasitic protist responsible for toxoplasmosis, Toxoplasma gondii (Drozdowicz et al 2002).

Rea’s research on ABC transporters has largely focused on members of this superfamily from plant and fungal sources.  His group, in collaboration with Dr. Dennis J. Thiele’s group (then at the University of Michigan) molecularly and biochemically defined yeast cadmium factor 1 (YCF1), a yeast (S. cerevisiae) MRP- (ABCC-) type ABC transporter to show that it catalyzes the ATP-energized vacuolar uptake of glutathione- (GS-) conjugates (Li et al 1996).  This resulted in the discovery of a new pathway for heavy metal detoxification: YCF1-catalyzed vacuolar sequestration of GS-heavy metal complexes, as exemplified by the bis(glutathionato)cadmium and tris(glutathionato)arsenic complexes formed between glutathione and cadmium (Li et al 1997) and arsenic, respectively (Ghosh et al 1999).  Using tools developed in the course of their studies of YCF1 for parallel screens for similar functionalities from plant sources, Rea’s group was the first to both functionally and molecularly define an ABC transporter from a vascular plant (Arabidopsis thaliana) (Lu et al 1997; Lu et al 1998).  The ABC transporters identified, AtMRP1 and AtMRP2 (alias AtABCC1 and AtABCC2), were shown to be involved in the ATP-energized vacuolar sequestration and detoxification of both endogenous and exogenous toxins, largely amphipathic anions primarily in the form of GS-conjugates (Lu et al 1997; 1998; Liu et al 2001).  In compiling the first complete inventory of ABC proteins from a plant source, Rea and colleagues established that these organisms allocate a substantial fraction of their genomes to members of this protein family. The genome of Arabidopsis thaliana, for instance, contains more than 130 ORFs for these proteins of which more than 100 are transmembrane proteins (Sánchez-Fernández et al 2001; Rea 2007). This gene count far exceeds that of humans and other animals.

It was Rea’s group (Vatamaniuk et al 1999) and two others (Clemens et al 1999; Ha et al 1999) that simultaneously and independently first identified genes encoding the enzyme, phytochelatin (PC) synthase responsible for the synthesis of phytochelatins (PCs) by transfer of a γ-Glu-Cys unit from one thiol peptide to another or to a previously-synthesized PC for the detoxification of heavy metals.  Thereafter, he and his colleagues: (1) Defined the basic catalytic mechanism and mode of activation of the enzyme by heavy metals by establishing that blocked thiols are sufficient for PC synthase-catalyzed transpeptidation of glutathione (GSH) and related thiol peptides via a substituted enzyme mechanism (Vatamanaiuk et al 2000); (2) Determined that PC synthase is a dipeptidyl transferase that forms an enzyme γ-Glu-Cys acyl-intermediate during catalysis (Vatamaniuk et al (2004); (3) Demonstrated that PC synthase is a distant cousin of papain-like cysteine proteases and deploys a Cys-His-Asp catalytic triad to catalyze the dipeptidyl transferase reaction through the formation of a γ-Glu-Cys-thioester intermediate (Rea et al 2004; Romanyuk et al 2006); results that were subsequently independently confirmed by crystallographic analyses of a PC synthase homolog from the cyanobacterium Nostoc sp. PCC 7120 (Vivares et al 2005; Rea 2006).  One of the most surprising findings to come from the cloning of PC synthase and its equivalents from other plants and the fungus Schizosaccharomyces pombe was the discovery of a similar gene in an animal.  Routine database searches disclosed a homologous single-copy gene (ce-pcs-1) in the genome of the nematode Caenorhabditis elegans, which Rea and colleagues took a step further to demonstrate that CePCS1 is a PC synthase, and that targeted suppression of ce-pcs-1 by the double-stranded RNA interference (RNAi) technique confers a cad1-like heavy metal-hypersensitive phenotype on C. elegans (Vatamaniuk et al 2001; Vatamaniuk et al 2002).  While other gene products had been inferred to contribute to heavy metal tolerance in C. elegans, CePCS1 was the first for which to a firm biochemical basis for the effects seen at the level of the whole organism was established.

Rea's current research, which owes its origins to his leadership of the Vagelos Program in Life Sciences & Management, focuses on case studies of the interface between life sciences research and its implementation; the difficult transition from discovery in the laboratory to success in the market and/or toward the expansion of humanitarian efforts. Examples of such case studies are 'Statins: from fungus to pharma,’ 'Ivermectin and river blindness,’ 'Can skinny fat beat obesity?', and 'Metformin: out of the backwaters and into the mainstream'; four articles aimed primarily at the educated non-specialist.  The book Managing Discovery: Harnessing Creativity to Drive Biomedical Innovation (2018), coauthored with Mark V. Pauly and Lawton R. Burns, which is an extension of this research effort, addresses the link between life sciences discoveries and their dependence on the investor-driven market system.  It looks at how the science actually played out through the interplay of personalities, the cultures within and between academic and corporate entities, and the significance of serendipity not as a mysterious phenomenon but one intrinsic to the successes and failures of the experimental approach. With newly aggregated data and case studies, the fundamental economic underpinnings of investor-driven discovery management are considered, not as an obstacle or deficiency, but as the only means by which scientists and managers can navigate the unknowable to discover new products.

 Awards 
Rea has received several awards and honors for his research and educational accomplishments.  His awards and honors in the research sector include the President’s Medal from the Society for Experimental Biology, UK for pioneering investigations of primary proton pumps (1990), a Cozzarelli Prize from the National Academies of Science, USA for coauthorship of a paper of outstanding scientific excellence and originality (2010), and election as a Fellow of the American Association for the Advancement of Science for outstanding fundamental research discoveries on the membrane transport and detoxification of xenobiotics, and for distinguished accomplishments and creativity in science education (2013).  His awards and honors in the educational sector include an Ira H. Abrams Memorial Award for Distinguished Teaching (the College of Arts and Sciences’ highest teaching honor) (2009), a Christian R. and Mary F. Lindback Foundation Award for Distinguished Teaching (the University's highest teaching honor) (2014), the Department of Biology’s Award for Excellence in Teaching (1996, 2005, 2013, 2019), and a Wharton Teaching Excellence Award (2019).

In recognition of his seminal biochemical research, and dedication and devotion to teaching, science-communication, and mentorship, Rea was awarded an honorary Doctorate of Science (D.Sc.) by the University of Oxford, UK (2020).

 Publications 
Rea is the author of over 100 papers and commentaries, and the author of two books, Fall (2004) and Managing Discovery: Harnessing Creativity to Drive Biomedical Innovation (2018).Fall (2004), a photo-book for which Rea wrote the text, is a "hyper-macroscopic analysis of the color transformations characteristic of tree foliage in the Northeastern United States autumn...[featuring] vivid and brilliant images." This book was a joint project with Rea's former biochemistry mentee, Christopher Griffith, who is now a professional photographer.Managing Discovery: Harnessing Creativity to Drive Biomedical Innovation (2018), coauthored with Mark V. Pauly and Lawton R. Burns, addresses the link between life sciences discoveries and their dependence on the investor-driven market system through in-depth considerations of the challenges that both scientists and managers must face in the pharmaceutical and medical device industries.

Other publications, a selection:

 Rea, P.A. (2022) How glyphosate cropped up. American Scientist, 110: 170-177.
 Rea, P.A. (2020) Phytochelatin Synthase. In: Encyclopedia of Life Sciences (eLS). John Wiley & Sons, Ltd: Chichester, 1-15. DOI: 10.1002/9780470015902.a0028220.
 Rea, P.A. (2018) Plant Vacuoles. In: Encyclopedia of Life Sciences (eLS). John Wiley & Sons, Ltd: Chichester, 1-14. DOI: 10.1002/9780470015902.a0001675.pub3.
Cahoon, R.E., Lutke, W.K., Cameron, J.C., Chen, S., Lee, S.G., Rivard, R.S., Rea, P.A., Jez, J.M. (2015) Adaptive engineering of phytochelatin-based heavy metal tolerance. J. Biol. Chem., 290: 17321-17330.
 Rea, P.A. (2012) Phytochelatin synthase: of a protease a peptide polymerase made. Physiol. Plant., 145: 154-164.
Park, J., Song, W.-J., Mendoza-Cózat, D.G., Suter-Grotemeyer, M., Shim, D., Hörtensteiner, S., Geisler, M., Rea, P.A., Rentsch, D., Schroeder, J.I., Lee, Y., Martinoia, E. (2010) Arsenic tolerance in Arabidopsis is mediated by two ABCC-type phytochelatin transporters. Proc. Natl. Acad. Sci. USA, 107: 21187-21192.
 Rea, P.A. (2009) Talk about teaching and learning: The kick is in finding out stuff about stuff and sharing it with others. Almanac'', 55: 8.

References

External links 
 

University of Pennsylvania faculty
University of Pennsylvania Department of Biology faculty
Alumni of the University of Sussex
1957 births
Living people
Alumni of Magdalen College, Oxford
English biochemists